Elections for the Banff and Buchan District Council took place on 1 May 1980, alongside elections to the councils of Scotland's various other districts.

Aggregate results

References

1980 Scottish local elections
1980